Jean-Baptiste Le Carpentier (1 June 1759, Helleville - 27 January 1829, Mont-Saint-Michel) was a French political activist from Normandy.

Sources
 Histoire et dictionnaire de la Révolution française 1789-1799 by Jean Tulard, Jean-François Fayard, Alfred Fierro
 La Terreur à Port-Malo by Etienne Maignen,  bulletin et mémoires de la Société archéologique et historique d'Ille-et-Vilaine,t.CVIII, 2004

1759 births
1829 deaths
People of the French Revolution